Boris Baczynsky (Baczynski) (14 October 1945, Vienna – 2008, United States) was an American chess master.

Joining the westward exodus in 1944 - because of the Red Army's approach - the Baczynsky family from Ukraine wound up in Vienna. Then they emigrated to the United States. He was an editor of the Chess World Magazine.

References

External links

1945 births
2008 deaths
Ukrainian chess players
American chess players
American people of Ukrainian descent
Ukrainian refugees
20th-century chess players